Globus Airlines was a Russian airline based at Moscow Domodedovo Airport operating for S7 Airlines.

History
The airline was founded in the spring of 2008 by S7 Airlines, a major Russian airline, based in Novosibirsk for charter flights. Globus started operations shortly thereafter with a Tupolev Tu-154M, which was previously in use at the parent company. Another Tupolev Tu-154M and the first Boeing 737-400 were transferred from S7 Airlines to Globus later in the first year of operation, followed by second-hand Boeing 737-800 aircraft. Its purpose was to concentrate on flying to holiday destinations. From 2010 Globus has been operating mainly regular domestic services, however still in cooperation with its former owner, S7 Airlines.

In August 2019, the airline's head announced that S7 Airlines and Globus Airlines would merge by December 2019, therefore closing the operations of the second airline. By early December 2019, the merger had been completed.

Destinations

Globus Airlines operated scheduled and charter flights to domestic and some international destinations on behalf of S7 Airlines.

Asia
Armenia
Yerevan – Zvartnots International Airport seasonal
China
Beijing – Beijing Capital International Airport
Hong Kong – Hong Kong International Airport seasonal
Shanghai – Shanghai Pudong International Airport seasonal
Cyprus
Larnaca – Larnaca International Airport
Paphos – Paphos International Airport
Kyrgyzstan
Osh – Osh Airport
Tajikistan
Khujand – Khujand Airport seasonal

Europe
Croatia
Pula – Pula Airport seasonal
Iceland
Reykjavík – Keflavík International Airport seasonal

Italy
Genoa – Genoa Cristoforo Colombo Airport seasonal
Verona – Verona Villafranca Airport
Montenegro 
Tivat – Tivat Airport
Russia
Anapa – Anapa Airport seasonal
Barnaul – Barnaul Airport
Bratsk – Bratsk Airport
Chita – Kadala Airport
Gorno-Altaysk – Gorno-Altaysk Airport
Irkutsk – International Airport Irkutsk focus city
Kaliningrad – Khrabrovo Airport seasonal
Kemerovo – Kemerovo International Airport
Krasnodar – Krasnodar International Airport
Krasnoyarsk – Krasnooyarsk International Airport
Mineralnye Vody – Mineralnye Vody Airport
Moscow – Moscow Domodedovo Airport base
Nizhnevartovsk – Nizhnevartovsk Airport
Norilsk – Alykel Airport
Novosibirsk – Tolmachevo Airport base
Novy Urengoy – Novy Urengoy Airport
Sochi – Sochi International Airport
St Petersburg – Pulkovo Airport
Ulan-Ude – Baikal International Airport
Vladikavkaz – Beslan Airport
Spain
Barcelona – Barcelona–El Prat Josep Tarradellas Airport

Fleet

Current fleet

As of October 2019, prior to the merger into S7 Airlines, the Globus Airlines fleet comprised the following aircraft:

Retired fleet

References

External links

 Official website

Defunct airlines of Russia
Airlines established in 2007
Airlines disestablished in 2019
Russian companies established in 2007